Romy is a given name, often a diminutive form of names such as Rosemary or Roman or Romeo.
People with the name include:

Men 

Romy Cachola, nickname of Romeo Munoz Cachola, Philippines-born Hawaiian politician
Romy Diaz (1940–2005), real name José Roméo Bustillos Díaz, Filipino actor
Romy González (born 1996), nickname of Roman A. González, American baseball player for the Chicago White Sox
Romy Gosz (1910–1966), nickname for Roman Luis Gosz, American polka musician
Romy Haag (born 1948), real name Edouard Frans Verba, Dutch dancer and singer
Romy Hoffman (born 1980), Australian hip-hop singer known as Macromantics
Romy Pastrana (born 1958), nickname of Romeo Pastrana, Filipino actor, comedian, and politician
Romy Gauchan Thakali, Nepali politician
Romy Tiongco, Filipino  former Catholic priest and Christian Aid worker
Romy van Oojen (born 1971), Belgian singer and former member of 2 Unlimited

Women 

 Romy Bühler (born 1994), Swiss figure skater
 Romy Dya, Dutch singer-songwriter
Romy Eggimann (born 1995), Swiss ice hockey player
Romy Farah (born 1985), Colombian professional tennis player
Romy Gill (born 1972), British-Indian chef, food writer, author, and broadcaster
Romy Gruber (born 1993), Luxembourger footballer
Romy Kalb-Gundermann (1934–2019), German soprano
Romy Kasper (born 1988), German racing cyclist
Romy Kermer (born 1956), German figure skating coach and pair skater
Romy Logsch (born 1982), German bobsledder
Romy Madley Croft, singer and guitarist from The xx
Romy McCahill (born 1993), Scottish model and beauty pageant titleholder
Romy Monteiro (born 1992), Dutch singer, actress, and TV presenter
Romy Müller (born 1958), East German athlete
Romy Pansters (born 1996), Dutch Paratriathlete and Paralympic swimmer
Romy Papadea, Greek songwriter
Romy Rosemont (born 1964), American actress
Romy Saalfeld (born 1960), German competitive rower
Romy Schmidt (born 1965), Chilean lawyer, academic, researcher and politician
Romy Schneider (1938–1982), nickname for Rosemarie Magdalena Albach, German-French actress
Romy Simpkins (born 1993), British model, mental health ambassador, and beauty pageant titleholder
Romy Speelman (born 2000), Dutch footballer
Romy Tarangul (born 1987), German jukoda
Romy Teitzel (born 1999), Australian rugby league footballer
Romy Timmins (born 1989), Australian rules footballer
Romy Tittel, Canadian politician and former leader of the Green Party of Alberta
Romy Weiß-Scherberger (1935–2016), nickname for Rosemarie Weiß-Scherberger, German fencer

Fictional characters
Romy White, one of the main characters in the films Romy and Michele's High School Reunion and Romy and Michele: In the Beginning, played by Mira Sorvino
Romy, a character in the Spanish animated series, Around the World with Willy Fog
Romy, the protagonist of the 2019 Dutch drama film, Romy's Salon, based on the book of the same name by Tamara Bos

Notes

Unisex given names